Drymaplaneta heydeniana is a species of cockroach.

Distribution
Drymaplaneta heydeniana is endemic to Western Australia, and adventive in New Zealand.

References

Cockroaches
Insects described in 1864